Microlechia klimeschi is a moth in the family Gelechiidae. It was described by Povolný in 1972. It is found on the Canary Islands.

The length of the forewings is 3.5–4 mm. The forewings are light ochreous to yellowish-brown with various well defined dark to blackish markings. The hindwings are dirty whitish.

The larvae feed on Whitania aristata.

References

Microlechia
Moths described in 1972